"Chica Ideal" (English: "Ideal Girl") is a song by Colombian singer Sebastián Yatra and Puerto Rican rapper Guaynaa. It was written by Yatra, Guaynaa, Daniel Pérez, Manuel Bustillo, Andy Clay, Juan Camilo Vargas, Keityn, and its producer Ovy on The Drums. Through Universal Music Latino, the song was released on October 16, 2020.

The song interpolates the 2003 song "Quiero Una Chica" by Colombian duo Latin Dreams.

Commercially, the song topped the Costa Rica, El Salvador, Guatemala, Honduras, Puerto Rico, Argentina and US Latin airplay charts, while peaking within the top five of every Latin American country. Additionally, it peaked at number eight on the Argentina Hot 100 and Mexico Airplay charts, number ten in Spain, and number thirteen on the US Hot Latin Songs chart.

A remix version of the song with fellow rapper and producer will.i.am of Black Eyed Peas was released in February 2021.

Music video
The music video depicts a "post-COVID-19 pandemic fantasy". Yatra and Guaynaa are seen playing basketball in the year 2020 with a group of people wearing masks. After losing the ball and searching for it in the woods, they wind up at a lit pool party (pandemic-free) in the year 2021.

Charts

Certifications

See also
 List of airplay number-one hits in Argentina
 List of Billboard Argentina Hot 100 top-ten singles in 2020
 List of Billboard number-one Latin songs of 2021

References

2020 songs
2020 singles
Sebastián Yatra songs
Songs written by Sebastián Yatra
Spanish-language songs
Latin pop songs